Argidava (Argidaua, Arcidava, Arcidaua, Argedava, Argedauon, Argedabon, Sargedava, Sargedauon, Zargedava, Zargedauon) was a Dacian fortress town close to the Danube, inhabited and governed by the Albocense. Located in today's Vărădia, Caraș-Severin County, Romania.

After the Roman conquest of Dacia, it became a military and a civilian center, with a castrum (Roman fort) (see Castra Arcidava) built in the area. The fort was used to monitor the shores of the Danube.

Ancient sources 
The oldest found potential reference to Argidava is in the form Argedauon or Argedabon, written in stone, in the Decree of Dionysopolis (48 BC). However, it is unclear as to whether this refers to Argidava or a distinct  town Argedava.

Decree of Dionysopolis

Ptolemy's Geographia 
Argidava is mentioned in Ptolemy's Geographia (c. 150 AD) in the form Argidaua as an important Dacian town, at latitude 46° 30' N and longitude 45° 15' E (note that he used a different meridian and some of his calculations were off).

Tabula Peutingeriana 
Argidava is also depicted in the Tabula Peutingeriana (2nd century AD) in the form Arcidaua, on a Roman road network, between Apo Fl. and Centum Putea. The location corresponds to the one mentioned by Ptolemy and the different form is most likely caused by the G/C graphical confusion commonly found in Latin documents.

See also 
 Argedava
 Dacia
 Roman Dacia
 List of ancient cities in Thrace and Dacia
 Dacian davae

Notes

References

External links 

 Ptolemy's Geography at LacusCurtius – Book III, Chapter 8 Location of Dacia (from the Ninth Map of Europe) (English translation, incomplete)
 Sorin Olteanu's Project: Linguae Thraco-Daco-Moesorum – Toponyms Section
 A fost Argedava (Popesti) resedinta statului geto-dac condus de Burebista? – Article in Informatia de Giurgiu (Romanian)
 Searchable Greek Inscriptions at The Packard Humanities Institute (PHI)  – Argedava segment from Decree of Dionysopolis reviewed in Inscriptiones graecae in Bulgaria repertae by Georgi Mihailov

Dacian towns
Archaeological sites in Romania
Ruins in Romania
Historic monuments in Caraș-Severin County
History of Banat